"Face Down" is the debut single by the Red Jumpsuit Apparatus from their debut album, Don't You Fake It (2006). The song peaked at number 24 in the United States and number four in New Zealand. It tied 30 Seconds to Mars' "The Kill" as the longest-running song on the US Billboard Modern Rock Tracks chart without reaching number one, at 52 weeks. "Face Down" remains the band's most successful single. Four versions were released, including an acoustic version.

Lyrics and video
"Face Down" is notable for lyrics that detail suffering from domestic abuse. Written by lead singer Ronnie Winter, the song is about the domestic abuse that he and his brother lived through as children.  He's said the "lyrics are deeply personal" and he wanted to "help kids who are in similar situations cope."  

The music video parallels the song in its treatment of violence in a relationship. After arriving home, a young woman examines a bruise on her lower back, and begins to look for and examine items that she associates with her boyfriend (e.g. pictures, a card, letters). As she does so, objects around her start to suddenly move as if thrown or destroyed by the unseen hand of an abuser. The level of damage done escalates throughout the video, though the young woman does not react or acknowledge the growing violence around her. After a chair flies through the living room window, she takes the pictures and letters and throws them into a garbage can outside her house.  This unfolding scene is juxtaposed with shots of the band performing the song in a living room with lighting and decor which appear to be the young woman's.

The music video for the symphonic version (released 2022) shows the story from the original music video continued. She is now in a healthy relationship and is fighting through her PTSD by producing videos about abuse to help others who might be suffering like she once did.

Charts

Weekly charts

Year-end charts

Certifications

In popular culture
"Face Down" is featured on Saints Row 2s soundtrack. It was also featured on the MX vs. ATV Untamed soundtrack.

References

2006 songs
2006 debut singles
The Red Jumpsuit Apparatus songs
Song recordings produced by David Bendeth
Songs about domestic violence
Virgin Records singles